Super Six or Super 6 may refer to:

 Super Six (film), a Sri Lankan film
 Super Six World Boxing Classic, a super middleweight tournament starting in 2009
 Six-red snooker, a snooker variant also known as Super 6s
 Super 6 Rugby, an Australasian rugby union tournament played in 1993; predecessor of Super 10 and Super Rugby 
 Super 6 (rugby union), a semi-professional competition for Scottish rugby union clubs
 Super 6, a stage of the Cricket World Cup in 1999 and 2003
 The Super 6, an animated cartoon series from 1966
 Hudson Super Six, an American car first produced in 1916
 Super Six corrugated roof sheeting and fencing
 A series of road bicycle models made by Cannondale Bicycle Corporation
 Soccer Saturday Super 6, a free-to-enter online prediction game offered by Sky Betting & Gaming
 Essex Super Six, a brand of automobile produced between 1918 and 1922